Hans Dormbach (born 4 June 1908, date of death unknown) was a German cyclist. He competed in the team pursuit event at the 1928 Summer Olympics.

References

External links
 

1908 births
Year of death missing
German male cyclists
Olympic cyclists of Germany
Cyclists at the 1928 Summer Olympics
Cyclists from Cologne
20th-century German people